Nero Wolfe is an American drama television series based on the characters in Rex Stout's series of detective stories. The series aired on NBC from January 16 to August 25, 1981. William Conrad fills the role of the detective genius Nero Wolfe, and Lee Horsley is his assistant Archie Goodwin. Produced by Paramount Television, the series updates the world of Nero Wolfe to contemporary New York City and draws few of its stories from the Stout originals.

Plot
Nero Wolfe (William Conrad) enjoys a life of refined self-indulgence in his comfortable Manhattan brownstone — reading, dining, spending regular hours in his rooftop plant rooms, and only reluctantly involving himself in the detection of crime. Famously sedentary, Wolfe relies on his legman Archie Goodwin (Lee Horsley) to collect the clues and the suspects in any case at hand, while he spars with his live-in chef Fritz Brenner (George Voskovec) and bickers with his resident orchid nurse Theodore Horstmann (Robert Coote, in his final role). Often assisted by freelance detective Saul Panzer (George Wyner), Wolfe and Archie customarily gather the suspects in Wolfe's office and present the solution to the exasperated Inspector Cramer (Allan Miller) of Manhattan Homicide.

Production
In March 1980, Nero Wolfe was one of half-a-dozen new series being considered by the team of Brandon Tartikoff and Fred Silverman at NBC, according to Peter Boyer of the Associated Press. "The idea has been tried unsuccessfully on TV before, most recently by ABC," Boyer reported. "But NBC has an angle going that will certainly make this Nero Wolfe worthy of notice — the distinct possibility that Orson Welles will play the lead role." The pilot episode was to be written by Leon Tokatyan (Lou Grant).

When filming of the TV series was under way later that year, columnist Marilyn Beck wrote that Nero Wolfe had been planned as a starring vehicle for Welles until he decided that he wanted NBC to change the concept from a one-hour weekly series to a series of 90-minute specials, and that he wanted his scenes filmed at his Los Angeles home. Some 20 years later, in a story about the A&E Nero Wolfe series, the Toronto Star reported that Welles had bowed out of the NBC series because he was unable to learn the dialogue. Other reports had it that Welles had refused to work with Paramount's producers, who wanted to "make Nero Wolfe more human." Welles and Paramount had already had creative differences over the Rex Stout adaptations; Paramount had purchased the entire set of Nero Wolfe stories for Welles in 1976, but in 1977 Welles had bowed out of Paramount's first effort to bring Nero Wolfe to television, in an ABC-TV movie.

On June 30, 1980, the Associated Press reported that William Conrad would play the title role in NBC's Nero Wolfe.

"I've loved the novels for 25 years," Conrad said. "And I love his life-style. I don't have to run any more. My poor feet are still aching from all the running I had to do in Cannon."

In December 1980, NBC announced that Nero Wolfe would begin airing in January 1981, as "an ideal alternative to the competition in this time period" — The Dukes of Hazzard. The Dukes of Hazzard was then ranked number 2 in the Nielsen ratings.

"American Nero Wolfe fans had their dreams come true in 1981, when the NBC network allowed viewers on a weekly, prime time visit to the infamous New York brownstone on West 35th Street," wrote Brian Sheridan in the Spring 2008 issue of The Gazette: The Journal of the Wolfe Pack. Sheridan interviewed Lee Horsley, who found his first major role when he was cast as Archie Goodwin. Horsley recalled an enjoyable relationship with William Conrad, whose off-screen demeanor was a perfect fit for the character. "He was definitely Nero Wolfe down to the toes," Horsley said.

"I remember the days when he would shoot the final scene (of an episode) when Wolfe called all the suspects together," says Horsley. "Bill (Conrad) had in his contract that he would only work so many hours a day. If the clock struck whatever, and it was time for him to go, he'd put on his bedroom slippers and he was gone. It didn’t matter if we were in the middle of a scene or not. He loved the work but he was that way. When he decided he didn’t want to play anymore, that was it. We'd have to figure it out how to shoot the rest of the scene just to get it done."

Horsley spoke of his love for Rex Stout's books and characters, and credited the care taken with the production's art direction, set design and wardrobe in creating the atmosphere of the stories. "It was so great to go into work," he said.

The sets for Nero Wolfe were designed by John Beckman, whose  credits include Casablanca, Lost Horizon and The Maltese Falcon.  The plant rooms were stocked by Zuma Canyon Orchids of Malibu, California, which on the eve of the series registered the hybrid Phalaenopsis Nero Wolfe with the Royal Horticultural Society.

Cast

 William Conrad as Nero Wolfe
 Lee Horsley as Archie Goodwin
 George Voskovec as Fritz Brenner
 Robert Coote as Theodore Horstmann
 George Wyner as Saul Panzer
 Allan Miller as Inspector Cramer

Guest stars included Richard Anderson, Ramon Bieri, Delta Burke, Linden Chiles, Charles Cioffi, Patti Davis, John de Lancie, John Ericson, Mary Frann, David Hedison, Katherine Justice, Robert Loggia (albeit, uncredited), Darren McGavin, Barry Nelson, John Randolph, Russ Tamblyn and Lana Wood.

Episodes
Although the series was titled Rex Stout's Nero Wolfe, the scripts departed considerably from the Stout originals. Only seven of the 14 episodes are credited as being based upon Stout stories. All episodes were set in contemporary New York City.

Broadcast history
First telecast January 16, 1981, Nero Wolfe aired Fridays from 9 to 10 p.m. ET — as NBC's challenge to the hit CBS show, The Dukes of Hazzard. In April 1981 Nero Wolfe was moved to Tuesdays from 10 to 11 p.m. ET, where it continued to air until June 2, 1981. Repeat episodes continued to air until August 25, 1981.

Nero Wolfe was victim to an NBC programming strategy that was changed not long after the series left the air. Brandon Tartikoff was named president of the network's entertainment division in 1981, and he began to turn around the fortunes of the last-place network. "In the past, a series thought to have 'breakout' potential has been scheduled in a depressed timeslot," Tartikoff told the Associated Press in December 1981. "So Gangster Chronicles was played off against Love Boat, Nero Wolfe against Dukes of Hazzard, Hill Street Blues against Fantasy Island." Tartikoff implemented a new approach — programming to strengthen an entire evening's primetime schedule rather than challenging another network's hit show.

In April 1996, when the TV Land network made its debut, Nero Wolfe was featured in its "Saturday Cavalcade" lineup of great detectives. In 1999 the series was part of an afternoon block of TV Land's counterprogramming to network soap operas, and it also aired in the wee hours of the morning.

Awards and nominations

Reviews and commentary
 Donn Downy, The Globe and Mail — Wolfe violated most of the rules in his well-ordered universe, probably because of the scriptwriters' misguided desire to make the character more palatable. In the process, he becomes just a run-of-the-mill private eye who is fatter and wealthier than most, but certainly no smarter or eccentric. Scriptwriters Peter Nasco and David Knapp undermine the character almost from the outset: Wolfe actually discusses a case during the sacred hours in the greenhouse, he smiles, and even leaves his beloved Manhattan brownstone in the final scene to visit a boy recovering in hospital after being hit by a car. Stout, who could never be accused of sentimentality, had the lad dead in the second chapter. But the transgressions don't end there. ... Given these limitations, William Conrad as Wolfe comes off rather well [and] supplied a workmanlike performance, so any faults lie with the writers, not the actor.
 Peter Boyer, Associated Press — I know, I know, the show pales next to The Rockford Files. But I've tried it a couple of times and I think there's a good TV series there, obscured, admittedly, by some inane scripts. Nero Wolfe has some very valuable assets: It is adult, it has at least the broad outlines of mystery and it has a charismatic central character. The character, of course, is the wonderfully eccentric Wolfe of the Rex Stout novels, a rotund, sedentary savant who fusses over orchids and has others do his physical work. NBC and the producers can't take credit for the character, of course, but they did have the good sense to hire William Conrad, who is perfectly suited to the part, to play Wolfe. Conrad seems to delight in the role.
Los Angeles Times — Not quite Rex Stout's Nero Wolfe but still head and shoulders above most crime series ... Certainly the Tuesday night series has a quality worth more than all the Dukes who ever came out of Hazzard.
 William Conrad — How the hell should I know what makes a hit TV series? I was really excited about doing a show called Nero Wolfe. I thought it couldn't fail. Here we had one of the most popular characters in mystery fiction; everybody has read a Rex Stout novel. The books still sell, although they were written 50 years ago. But do you know how long we lasted? Just 13 weeks. Try to figure that one out.
Stuart M. Kaminsky — When Nero Wolfe came to television, I made my love of Archie and Wolfe known to NBC, and one of the great disappointments of my professional life is that the series was cancelled after I had been assured that I would write the opening episode of the next season. I wanted to bring The Doorbell Rang to life even if it wasn't the right Wolfe and Archie.
Diane Holloway, Cox News Service — NBC's woefully inadequate series in 1981 ... tried to update the characters and the language, and the whole thing fell flat.
Paula Vitaris, Scarlet Street (2002) — Nero Wolfe did give us the brownstone, the rooftop nursery, a housebound Wolfe, and an active Archie, but that was about it. The NBC series updated the setting to contemporary times (1981), which meant Archie, always so fastidious about his wardrobe, could be seen wearing turtlenecks and (horrors!) blue jeans. Inspector Cramer was a brisk professional in three-piece suits rather than Stout's rumpled detective, and Wolfe himself was transformed into a not particularly fascinating eccentric, who in one instance became uncharacteristically nostalgic about a lost love. The show was a mix of new stories and none-too-faithful adaptations of the books.

Home media

On May 3, 2017, VEI announced a DVD release for Nero Wolfe. Reported to be "coming soon", Rex Stout's Nero Wolfe: The Complete Series comprises all 14 episodes and the 1977 pilot starring Thayer David.

References

External links

1981 American television series debuts
1981 American television series endings
1980s American crime television series
1980s American mystery television series
English-language television shows
NBC original programming
Nero Wolfe
Television shows based on American novels
Television series by CBS Studios
American detective television series